Prisca Mosimann (born 19 March 1975) is a Swiss former ice hockey player. She competed in the women's tournament at the 2006 Winter Olympics.

References

External links
 

1975 births
Living people
Swiss women's ice hockey players
Olympic ice hockey players of Switzerland
Ice hockey players at the 2006 Winter Olympics
People from Langenthal
Sportspeople from the canton of Bern